Night bus may refer to:

 The Night Bus, a 2007 Iranian film directed by Kiumars Pourahmad
 Night Bus (2007 film), an Italian noir-comedy film directed by Davide Marengo
 Night Bus (2017 film), an Indonesian thriller film
 The Knight Bus, a magical vehicle in the Harry Potter series
 Night service (public transport), also called night bus, owl service
 Night bus lines in Israel
 Night buses in London
 All Nighter (bus service), night bus service network in San Francisco Bay Area, California

See also:
 NightRide (bus service), bus service in Sydney, Australia